Tyson Jay Ritter (born April 24, 1984) is an American singer, songwriter, musician, actor, and model. He is best known as the lead vocalist, bassist, pianist, and songwriter of the multi-platinum selling American alternative rock band The All-American Rejects. As an actor, Ritter appeared as himself on the seventeenth episode of season three on the popular Fox series House which aired in April of 2007, he appeared as Dane on Amazon Video's Betas, recurred as rock musician Oliver Rome on NBC's Parenthood, and has had supporting roles in films, including  The House Bunny (2008) and Miss You Already (2015). In 2018, Ritter played recurring characters on two television series on AMC, Preacher and Lodge 49. Ritter joined the main cast of Preacher for its final season in 2019.

Early life

Ritter was born on April 24, 1984 in Stillwater, Oklahoma, to Tracy Jean Rains (née Lyons; born to Edwina Janora Lyons Sherman and Tony Eugene Lyons) and Tim Jay Ritter (born to Peggy Earline Ritter Sharpton and Steve Delano Ritter). His mother is an employee at Stillwater Public Schools. He has an older brother, Dr. Zack S. Ritter, DDS, who is an endodontist, and a younger sister, Bailey Ritter. He and his siblings graduated from Stillwater High School.

Career
Ritter met his bandmates while he was at a party in high school. After Jesse Tabish quit the band, and with the additions of Mike Kennerty and Chris Gaylor, The All-American Rejects were picked up by Doghouse Records, and later DreamWorks Records, and finally signed with the major label Interscope Records. In early 2018, the band left Interscope. As of July 2019, they are signed to Epitaph Records. The All-American Rejects have released four albums to date, and have sold over 10 million albums worldwide and 4 million singles.

Ritter has appeared in television series and films such as House (2007), The House Bunny (2008), Betas (2013–14), and Parenthood (2013–15). On November 5, 2013, Ritter released the song "Air" as a solo song to help "ride between the Rejects' next record", which was featured on Parenthood.

Shortly after the release of "Air" Tyson wrote the song "Collide", which was also featured on Parenthood.  The song was never released on the market but is still available on sites like YouTube.

Ritter's next projects included a role in the John Cusack film Love and Mercy (2014). He had also been cast in the lead role of singer Gregg Allman in the biopic Midnight Rider, directed by Randall Miller, but the film was halted in production, and ultimately cancelled, due to the death of camera assistant Sarah Jones. The following year, Ritter had a supporting role in the comedy-drama film Miss You Already, which starred Toni Collette and Drew Barrymore.

On August 6 2021, Ritter released was featured on the Lil Huddy single "Don't Freak Out", additionally featuring Iann Dior and Travis Barker, co-written by All American Rejects bandmate Nick Wheeler.

Ritter stars in the 2022 family drama film Prisoner's Daughter opposite Kate Beckinsale and Brian Cox.

In October 2022, Ritter formed the band Now More Than Ever with guitarist Izzy Fontaine and keyboardist Scott Chesak. Their debut album, Creatrix, is set to be released in March 2023.

Personal life 
Ritter and actress Elena Satine were engaged in April 2013 and married on New Year's Eve that year. Ritter and Satine welcomed a son in 2020.

Ritter is an investor in various tech companies including Hooch App.

Ritter lived in New Zealand during the COVID-19 pandemic.

Equipment
Ritter likes to use Fender bass guitars. He had previously used Epiphone Flying V or Epiphone Explorer basses during the era of The All-American Rejects, until he started to favor a Fender Precision Bass and started using them more often in his songs. Ritter was also seen using a Gibson Thunderbird bass on their early tours for Move Along and also with a rare Jackson Guitars V Bass. He then later used Fender Jaguar Bass guitars for later tours before switching back to Fender Precision Basses.

Filmography

Film

Television

References

External links
 
 

Living people
1984 births
American male singer-songwriters
Male models from Oklahoma
American rock singers
American rock bass guitarists
American tenors
American male bass guitarists
People from Stillwater, Oklahoma
Singer-songwriters from Oklahoma
Male actors from Oklahoma
Guitarists from Oklahoma
Interscope Records artists
DGC Records artists
Epitaph Records artists
American expatriates in New Zealand
21st-century American singers
21st-century American bass guitarists
21st-century American male singers